Climate change and agriculture may refer to:

 Effects of climate change on agriculture
 Greenhouse gas emissions from agriculture